Camila Gómez Ares (born 26 October 1994) is an Argentine footballer who plays as a midfielder for Boca Juniors. She was a member of the Argentina women's national team.

She appeared at the 2014 South American Games, the 2014 Copa América Femenina and the 2015 Pan American Games. She previously represented Argentina at the 2012 FIFA U-20 Women's World Cup.

Personal life
Gómez Ares is a supporter of San Lorenzo.

References

External links

1994 births
Living people
Footballers from Buenos Aires
Argentine women's footballers
Women's association football midfielders
Club Atlético River Plate (women) players
UAI Urquiza (women) players
Boca Juniors (women) footballers
Argentina women's youth international footballers
Argentina women's international footballers
Competitors at the 2014 South American Games
South American Games gold medalists for Argentina
South American Games medalists in football
Footballers at the 2015 Pan American Games
Pan American Games competitors for Argentina
20th-century Argentine women
21st-century Argentine women